The 1955 DFB-Pokal Final decided the winner of the 1954–55 DFB-Pokal, the 12th season of Germany's knockout football cup competition. It was played on 21 May 1955 at the Eintracht-Stadion in Braunschweig. Karlsruher SC won the match 3–2 against Schalke 04, to claim their 1st cup title.

Route to the final
The DFB-Pokal began with 32 teams in a single-elimination knockout cup competition. There were a total of four rounds leading up to the final. Teams were drawn against each other, and the winner after 90 minutes would advance. If still tied, 30 minutes of extra time was played. If the score was still level, a replay would take place at the original away team's stadium. If still level after 90 minutes, 30 minutes of extra time was played. If the score was still level, a drawing of lots would decide who would advance to the next round.

Note: In all results below, the score of the finalist is given first (H: home; A: away).

Match

Details

References

External links
 Match report at kicker.de 
 Match report at WorldFootball.net
 Match report at Fussballdaten.de 

Karlsruher SC matches
FC Schalke 04 matches
1954–55 in German football cups
1955
Sport in Braunschweig
20th century in Braunschweig
May 1955 sports events in Europe